Pepelyaev (masculine) or Pepelyaeva (feminine), sometimes transliterated as Pepelyayev, is a Russian surname. Notable people with the surname include:

Alexei Pepelyaev (born 1984), Russian ice hockey player
Anatoly Pepelyayev (1891–1938), Russian general
Viktor Pepelyayev (1885–1920), Russian politician
Yevgeny Pepelyaev (1918–2013), Soviet Air Force officer and Korean War flying ace

Russian-language surnames